The Edith Farnsworth House, formerly the Farnsworth House, is a historical house designed and constructed by Ludwig Mies van der Rohe between 1945 and 1951. The house was constructed as a one-room weekend retreat in a rural setting in Plano, Illinois, about 60 miles (96 km) southwest of Chicago's downtown. The steel and glass house was commissioned by Edith Farnsworth.

Mies created a 1,500-square-foot (140 m2) structure that is widely recognized as an exemplar of International Style of architecture. The retreat was designated a National Historic Landmark in 2006, after being listed on the National Register of Historic Places in 2004. The house is owned and operated as a house museum by the National Trust for Historic Preservation.

In celebration of the 2018 Illinois Bicentennial, the Farnsworth House was selected as one of the Illinois 200 great places by the American Institute of Architects Illinois component (AIA Illinois) and was recognized by USA Today Travel magazine, as one of AIA Illinois' selections for Illinois "25 Must See Buildings".

History
Ludwig Mies van der Rohe was retained by Farnsworth to design a weekend retreat during a dinner party in 1945. The wealthy client wanted to build a very special work of modern architecture, however, toward the end of construction, a dispute arose between architect and client that interfered with completion of the building.

Farnsworth had purchased the wooded, nine-acre riverfront property from the publisher of the Chicago Tribune, Robert R. McCormick. Mies developed the design in time for it to be included in an exhibition on his work at the Museum of Modern Art in New York in 1947. After completion of design, the project was placed on hold awaiting an inheritance from an ailing aunt of Farnsworth. Mies was to act as the general contractor as well as architect. Work began in 1950 and was substantially completed in 1951. The commission was an ideal one for any architect, but was marred by a very publicized dispute between Farnsworth and Mies that began near the end of construction. The total cost of the house was $74,000 in 1951 ($734,635 in 2020 dollars). A cost overrun of $15,600 over the initially approved construction budget of $58,400, was due to escalating material prices resulting from inflationary commodities speculation (in anticipation of demand arising from the mobilization for the Korean War). Near the completion of construction, the architect filed a lawsuit for non-payment of $28,173 in construction costs. The owner then filed a counter suit for damages due to alleged malpractice. The architect's attorneys proved that Farnsworth had approved the plans and budget increases, and the court ordered the owner to pay her bills. Farnsworth's malpractice accusations were dismissed as unsubstantiated. It was a bitter and hollow victory for Mies, considering the painful publicity that followed.

The conflict between the architect and the client resulted in an unfinished site and an unfurnished interior. The construction of a teak wardrobe closet and the system of bronze-framed screens to enclose the deck porch were completed to Mies' designs by his former employee, architect William Dunlap, and a local millworker who mediated between them. Mies never again communicated with Farnsworth, nor spoke publicly about their rumored relationship. Farnsworth continued to use the house as her weekend retreat for the next 21 years, often hosting architectural notables visiting to see the work of the world-famous architect.

Writing about the conflict in 1998, author Alice T. Friedman asserted that "[t]here is no evidence to suggest that [Farnsworth] sought to have her behavior challenged by the 'inner logic' of Mies's unyielding architectural vision; on the contrary, she seems to have had a clear idea about how she wanted to live and she expected the architect to respect her views... [S]he soon discovered that what Mies wanted, and what he had thought he had found in her, was a patron who would put her budget and her needs aside in favor of his own goals and dreams as an architect."

Encroachment and sale
In 1968, the local highway department condemned a  portion of the property adjoining the house for construction of a raised highway bridge over the Fox River, encroaching upon the original setting of the design. Farnsworth sued to stop the project, but lost the court case. She sold the house in 1972, retiring to her villa in Italy.

In 1972, the Edith Farnsworth House was purchased by British property magnate, art collector, and architectural aficionado Peter Palumbo. He removed the bronze screen enclosure of the porch, added air conditioning, electric heat, extensive landscaping, and his art collections to the grounds, including sculptures by Andy Goldsworthy, Anthony Caro, and Richard Serra. At the time, the interior was furnished with furniture Mies designed in the 1930s, but produced more recently by Knoll, as well as designs by Mies' grandson, Dirk Lohan, a Chicago architect Palumbo commissioned specifically for the house.

In 2001, Palumbo struck a deal with the state of Illinois, which agreed to buy the house for $7 million and open it full-time to the public, but state officials withdrew from the deal in early 2003, saying $7 million was too much to spend at a time of financial crisis.

After owning the property for 31 years, Palumbo removed the art and put the property up for sale with Sotheby's in 2003, raising serious concerns about the future of the building. Preservationists and contributors from around the world, including the Friends of the Farnsworth House, began a concerted preservation and fund-raising effort to keep the house on its original site. With this financial support, the National Trust for Historic Preservation and Landmarks Illinois were able to purchase the house in December 2003 for a reported $7.5 million. Now operated as a house museum, the Farnsworth House is open to the public, with tours conducted by the National Trust. The house is listed in the National Register and is designated a National Historic Landmark by the United States Department of the Interior.

Configuration
The essential characteristics of the house are immediately apparent. The extensive use of clear floor-to-ceiling glass opens the interior to its natural surroundings to an extreme degree. Two distinctly expressed horizontal slabs, which form the roof and the floor, sandwich an open space for living. The slab edges are defined by exposed steel structural members painted pure white. The slab ends extend beyond the column supports, creating cantilevers. A third floating slab, an attached terrace, acts as a transition between the living area and the ground. The house is accessed by two sets of wide steps connecting ground to terrace and then to porch.

Mies found the large open exhibit halls of the turn of the century to be very much in character with his sense of the industrial era. Here he applied the concept of an unobstructed space that is flexible for use by people. The interior appears to be a single open room, its space ebbing and flowing around two wood blocks; one a wardrobe cabinet and the other containing a kitchen, toilet, and fireplace block (the "core"). The larger fireplace-kitchen core seems to be a separate house nesting within the larger glass house. The building is essentially one large room filled with freestanding elements that provide subtle differentiation within an open space, implied but not dictated, zones for sleeping, cooking, dressing, eating, and sitting. Very private areas such as toilets, and mechanical rooms are enclosed within the core. Drawings recently made public by the Museum of Modern Art indicate that the architect provided ceiling details that allow for the addition of curtain tracks that would allow privacy separations of the open spaces into three "rooms".

Mies applied this space concept, with variations, to his later buildings, most notably at Crown Hall, his Illinois Institute of Technology campus masterpiece. The notion of a single room that can be freely used or zoned in any way, with flexibility to accommodate changing uses, free of interior supports, enclosed in glass and supported by a minimum of structural framing located at the exterior, is the architectural ideal that defines Mies' American career. The Farnsworth House is significant as his first complete realization of this ideal, a prototype for his vision of what modern architecture in an era of technology should be.

Architecture as an expression of the times

The Farnsworth House addresses basic issues about the relationship between the individual and his society. Mies viewed the technology-driven modern era in which an ordinary individual exists as largely beyond one's control. But he believed the individual can and should exist in harmony with the culture of one's time for successful fulfillment. His career was a long and patient search for an architecture that would be a true expression of the essential soul of his epoch, the Holy Grail of German Modernism. He perceived our epoch as the era of industrial mass production, a civilization shaped by the forces of rapid technological development. Mies wanted to use architecture as a tool to help reconcile the individual spirit with the new mass society in which the individual exists.

His answer to the issue is to accept the need for an orderly framework as necessary for existence, while making space for the freedom needed by the individual human spirit to flourish. He created buildings with free and open space within a minimal framework, using expressed structural columns. He did not believe in the use of architecture for social engineering of human behavior, as many other modernists did, but his architecture does represent ideals and aspirations. His mature design work is a physical expression of his understanding of the modern epoch. He provides the occupants of his buildings with flexible and unobstructed space in which to fulfill themselves as individuals, despite their anonymous condition in the modern industrial culture. The materials of his buildings, industrial manufactured products such as mill-formed steel and plate glass, certainly represent the character of the modern era, but he counterbalances these with traditional luxuries such as Roman travertine and exotic wood veneers as valid parts of modern life. Mies accepted the problems of industrial society as facts to be dealt with, and offered his idealized vision of how technology may be made beautiful and support the individual as well. He suggests that the downsides of technology decried by late nineteenth century critics such as John Ruskin, can be solved with human creativity, and shows us how in the architecture of this house.

Reconnecting the individual with nature is one of the great challenges of an urbanized society. The  rural site offered Mies an opportunity to bring the human relationship to nature into the forefront. Here he highlights the individual's connection to nature through the medium of a synthetic shelter. Mies said: "We should attempt to bring nature, houses, and the human being to a higher unity". Glass walls and open interior space are the features that create an intense connection with the outdoor environment, while providing a framework reduces opaque exterior walls to a minimum. The careful site design and integration of the exterior environment represents a concerted effort to achieve an architecture wedded to its natural context.

Mies conceived the building as an indoor-outdoor architectural shelter simultaneously independent of and intertwined with the domain of nature. Mies did not build on the flood-free upland portions of the site, choosing instead to tempt the dangerous forces of nature by building directly on the flood plain near the edge of the river. Philip Johnson referred to this type of experience of nature as "safe danger". The enclosed space and a screened porch are elevated five feet on a raised floor platform, just slightly above the 100-year flood level, with a large intermediate terrace level.

The house has a distinctly independent personality, yet also evokes strong feelings of a connection to the land. The levels of the platforms restate the multiple levels of the site, in a kind of poetic architectural rhyme, not unlike the horizontal balconies and rocks do at Wright's Fallingwater.

The house was anchored to the site in the cooling shadow of a large and majestic black maple (which was removed in 2013 due to age and damage). As Mies often did, the entrance is located on the sunny side, facing the river instead of the street, moving visitors around corners, and revealing views of the house and site from various angles as they approach the front door. The simple elongated cubic form of the house is parallel to the flow of the river, and the terrace platform is slipped downstream in relation to the elevated porch and living platform. Outdoor living spaces were designed to be extensions of the indoor space, with an open terrace and a screened porch (the screens have been removed). Yet the synthetic element always remains clearly distinct from the natural by its geometric forms that are highlighted by the choice of white as their primary color.

Integration with nature

Natural setting 

The Farnsworth House sits isolated on a floodplain that faces the Fox River, establishing the architect's concept of simple living.  Open views from all sides of the building help enlarge the living space area and aid flow between the living space and its natural surroundings.

Due to the floodplain, the Farnsworth House stands as an independent structure; construction materials include steel, concrete, natural stone, and glass. The steel, painted white, creates the structure that supports the floor and ceiling slabs. They are composed of concrete, along with radiant coil set in the floor used for heating purposes. The remainder of the exterior consists of the 1/4-inch-thick glass panels serving as walls.

Flooding 

Due to the Farnsworth House's location in the Fox River floodplain, the site often experiences low-level flooding. Despite the precautions taken in the design, waters have risen substantially inside of the structure multiple times in excess of FEMA 500-year flood levels.

 1954: three years after the completion of the House, flood waters rose over 2' in the interior living space.
 1996: a Mesoscale Convective System with rainfall of over 16" caused widespread flash flooding in the region. The water rose to over 5' on the interior of the Farnsworth House, causing significant damage to utilities, wood veneers, glass, and furnishings. 
 1997: approximately 2" of water made it into the interior of the structure. After this event, Peter Palumbo and Dirk Lohan embarked on a costly restoration project (estimated at $500,000).
 2008: the house was flooded by rains from the remnants of Hurricane Ike. Much of the furniture was saved by elevating it above the flood waters. The house was closed to the public for the remainder of 2008 for repairs and reopened for public visitation in spring 2009.

The National Trust for Historic Preservation has been developing a flood mitigation plan to deal with the ongoing threat to the structure posed by the river.

Other structures

Barnsworth Gallery 
It was announced in 2011 that the Illinois Institute of Technology was going to build a permanent exhibition space for the wardrobe that Edith Farnsworth commissioned for the Farnsworth House. The wardrobe was extensively damaged in the 1996, 1997, and 2008 floods, with its large size rendering any possible evacuation attempt costly and difficult. In an attempt to protect the wardrobe, curators of the Farnsworth House decided to have the wardrobe put on permanent display near the visitor center on the site, which is well above the 500-year flood plain. Under the direction of Professor Frank Flury, students of the Illinois Institute of Technology designed and constructed the Barnsworth Gallery to house the wardrobe and serve as an exhibition space.

Criticism and acclaim
The building design received accolades in the architectural press, resulting in swarms of uninvited visitors trespassing on the property to glimpse this latest Mies building. As a result of the accusations contained in Edith Farnsworth's lawsuit, the house soon became a prop in the larger national social conflicts of the McCarthy era. The weekend house became a lightning rod for anti-modernist publications, exemplified in the April 1953 issue of House Beautiful, which attacked it as a "communist-inspired effort" to supplant traditional American styles. Large areas of glass wall, flat roofs, purging of ornament, and a perceived lack of traditional warmth and coziness were characteristics of the International Style that were particular talking points of attack.

The poor energy efficiency of the Farnsworth House has been widely discussed as well. Farnsworth herself expressed dismay at the house's poor temperature control and tendency to attract insects when illuminated at night.

Nonetheless, the Farnsworth House has continued to receive critical acclaim as a masterpiece of the modernist style, and Mies went on to receive the Presidential Medal of Freedom for his contribution to American architecture and culture. Architect and critic Philip Johnson openly confessed how he was inspired by the design in the construction of his own Glass House in New Canaan, Connecticut in 1947 as his personal residence.
In the twenty-first century, Pulitzer Prize-winning architectural critics Paul Goldberger and Blair Kamin have both declared the house a masterpiece of modern architecture. Its timeless quality is reflected by the reverent fascination in the minimalist house shown by a new generation of design professionals and enthusiasts.

In 2021, the New York Times named it as one of the 25 most significant works of architecture since World War II.

Rededication
On November 17, 2021, Edith Farnsworth's birthday, a rededication of the house on its 70th anniversary was livestreamed on its Facebook and Instagram pages, during which it was officially renamed the Edith Farnsworth House in recognition of its owner's contribution to its benchmark design as well as her achievements as a research physician, classical violinist, poet, translator, and patron of the fine arts. "We hope this seemingly simple act of inserting her first name has the larger effect of inserting her into the ongoing history of modern architecture," said Scott Mehaffey, executive director of the Edith Farnsworth House.

In popular culture 

June Finfer’s Glass House was produced in New York in 2010.

In 2016, the movie, Batman v Superman: Dawn of Justice, featured a house modeled after the Farnsworth House. The follow-up film Justice League also features the same house in a trailer released at the 2017 San Diego Comic-Con.

In January 2019, writer-director Richard Press and HanWay Films announced an upcoming Farnsworth House film project starring Elizabeth Debicki as Dr. Edith Farnsworth and Ralph Fiennes as Ludwig Mies van der Rohe.

Gallery

See also
 National Register of Historic Places listings in Kendall County, Illinois
 Glass House
 Ben Rose House

References
Notes

Bibliography

External links

 Farnsworth House: Official site
 Farnsworth House Today: An in depth page from Columbia University, many diagrams and drawings.
 Het Glazen Huis te Geldrop: 1971 Dutch home based on the Farnsworth House, designed by H. G. Smelt.
 Photographs of the Farnsworth House
 Edith Farnsworth Papers at the Newberry Library
Illinois Great Places - Farnsworth House
Society of Architectural Historians SAH ARCHIPEDIA entry on the Farnsworth House

Ludwig Mies van der Rohe buildings
Historic house museums in Illinois
Houses on the National Register of Historic Places in Illinois
National Historic Landmarks in Illinois
Plano, Illinois
National Register of Historic Places in Kendall County, Illinois
Museums in Kendall County, Illinois
Architecture museums in the United States
Houses completed in 1951
1950s architecture in the United States
Modernist architecture in Illinois
International style architecture in Illinois
National Trust for Historic Preservation
Houses in Kendall County, Illinois
1951 establishments in Illinois